Gundgurthi is a village in the southern state of Karnataka, India. Administratively, Gundgurthi is under the Twar Wadgera panchayat village, Shahapur taluka of Yadgir district in Karnataka.  Gundgurthi is 9 km by on the road northeast of Hattigudur. The nearest railhead is in Yadgir.

Demographics 
 census, Gundgurthi had 1,448 inhabitants, with 715 males and 733 females.

References 
.

External links 
 

Villages in Yadgir district